Sir Charles Augustus Tegart  (5 October 1881 – 6 April 1946), one of the most hated figures in India, was an Irish-born police officer who served in British India. Tegart was one of the most inhuman police officers of the time and tortured the Indian freedom fighters mercilessly without any regret. He was known for his cruel treatment of nationalists and is a widely hated figure in the Bengal Presidency. He is known for brutally torturing Masterda or Surya Sen and breaking his every bone and tooth with a hammer before execution. Tegart was the mastermind behind the creation of the Arab Investigation Centres in Palestine during the Great Arab revolt.<ref name=BritishSpies2></r"ref></ref>

Early life

Born in Derry on 5 October 1881, Tegart was the son of a Church of Ireland clergyman, Rev. Joseph Poulter Tegart of Dunboyne, County Meath, and his wife Georgina Johnston. He was educated at Portora Royal School, Enniskillen and briefly at Trinity College, Dublin.

Career in India

He joined the Calcutta Police in 1901, becoming head of its Detective Department. Tegart is known for his ruthlessness and the inhuman torture he meted out to the Indian freedom fighters. He served almost continuously in Calcutta for a period of thirty years until he was appointed a member of the Secretary of State's Indian Council in December 1931.

He was the first officer of the Indian Imperial Police (IMP) in the Council and on his report its Special Branch was created.

He was awarded the King's Police Medal in 1911. He became Superintendent of Police in 1908, Deputy Commissioner in 1913, Deputy-Inspector General (Intelligence) in 1918, and Commissioner of Calcutta Police from 1923 to 1931.

Charles Tegart tried to suppress the nationalists of India such as Jatindranath Mukherjee at Balasore in Orissa on 9 September 1915.

Prior to his roles in India, he served as chief assistant to Ormonde Winter, the head of British Intelligence operations in Ireland during the Irish War of Independence. As a graduate of Trinity College, Dublin he retained contacts there and was awarded an honorary doctorate in 1933.

Career in Palestine

In view of his expertise, the British authorities sent him to the British Mandate of Palestine, then in the throes of the Arab Revolt, to advise the Inspector General on matters of security. He arrived there in December 1937.

In due course, he advised the construction of 77 reinforced concrete police stations and posts which could be defended against the attack, and of a frontier fence along the northern border of Palestine to control the movement of insurgents, goods, and weapons. His recommendations were accepted and 62 new "Tegart forts", as they came to be known, were built throughout Palestine, however all but a few located along the Lebanese border were built after the Arab Revolt, in 1940–41. Many of them are still in use, some by Israeli forces and others by Palestinian ones, while others were destroyed in various rounds of fighting.

Tegart also was the mastermind behind the establishment of the Arab Investigation Centres in Palestine during the Great Arab revolt. The centres were for the interrogation of suspected Arab insurgents, and torture was frequently used during interrogations. Tactics used include the Turkish practice of falaka (beating prisoners on the soles of their feet), though some historians have claimed that there is no conclusive proof to be found in Tegart's personal papers in support of the accusations that he personally oversaw interrogation centres or that he developed new torture techniques.

World War II

In 1942, Tegart headed up operations at the Ministry of Food in wartime Britain to combat the black market.

See also

 Arab Investigation Centres, built under the direction of Charles Tegart
 Cellular Jail
 Bagha Jatin, comments by Tegart on his death
 Herbert Dowbiggin, British colonial policeman

Further reading

 Tutun Mukherjee, "Colonialism, Surveillance and Memoirs of travel: Tegart's Diaries and the Andaman Cellular Jail", in Sachidananda Mohanty (ed.) Travel writing and the Empire, Katha, 2004. . See also  in The Hindu.

References

Archive sources

 Sir Charles Tegart Collection , held at St Antony's College, Oxford University.
 'Charles Tegart of the Indian Police': an unpublished biography by Lady Tegart, Mss Eur C235 in British Library, Asia, Pacific, and Africa Collections.

British colonial police officers
Irish knights
Indian Police Service officers in British India
Hindu–German Conspiracy
Indian police chiefs
Knights Commander of the Order of the Indian Empire
Members of the Royal Victorian Order
Police officers from Kolkata
Northern Irish recipients of the Queen's Police Medal
Administrators of Palestine
1881 births
1946 deaths
People of the 1936–1939 Arab revolt in Palestine
People educated at Portora Royal School
People from Derry (city)
Indian justices of the peace
Irish people in colonial India
British Combined Intelligence Unit personnel
Police misconduct in India
Police brutality in Israel
British people in Mandatory Palestine